St Machar Academy is an Aberdeen City Council secondary school on St Machar Drive. It is near King's College and St Machar's Cathedral.

St Machar Academy was created in 1988 from the merger of Hilton Academy and Powis Academy. In August 2002, Linksfield Academy was closed and merged with St Machar Academy.

References

External links
Official website

Secondary schools in Aberdeen
Educational institutions established in 1988
1988 establishments in Scotland